CNEP is a research center for durability prediction and failure analysis of plastics (polymer) materials.
The increasing use of plastics in daily life and for high-tech applications points out the necessity to improve their reliability.
These materials can eventually fail uring their service life, and it is crucial to be able, like in medicine, to diagnose the cause of the failure and to suggest solutions to solve the problem.
Plastic materials are made of polymer mostly associated with “formulation” products allowing to adjust their basic properties to the special use they are made for (fillers, pigments, additives, etc.).
In case of failure, decisive action is to perform the physicochemical analysis of the defect and eventually (in case of suspicion of oxidation products) to perform adapted artificial or natural aging allowing the evaluation of their long-term behavior.

CNEP: A research center for evaluation of polymer failures

(French) National Centre for the Evaluation of Photoprotection (CNEP) is a subsidiary company of University Blaise Pascal  created in 1986 by Professor Jacques Lemaire, former head of Laboratory of Molecular and Macromolecular Photochemistry (LPMM) - Clermont-Ferrand (France).
Initially the goal was to transfer the expertise of LPMM on polymer photoaging to industrial companies facing increasing problems of degradation (yellowing – bleaching - physical properties loss …). 
CNEP is today still associated with LPMM but also with many small, medium and world size companies working in various domains of polymer applications. More of 500 failure cases are examined each year by CNEP and expertise on the last twenty years is covering more of 100.000 different polymer formulations.

Progressively with the development of sophisticated analytical tools, CNEP was extending its activity to the direct physicochemical analysis of any failure in polymer material, not only derived from ageing (polymer degradation).
All research is made under contract with a confidentiality agreement.
Since 10 years CNEP is certified by the French Ministries of Higher Education and Industry as National Centre for Technical Research(CRT). Its contact with the complete chain of plastic production allows CNEP to play also an interfacial role between polymer producers, transformers, and constructors bringing:
- collective approach of subjects of common interest.
- quality control and standardisation ;
- legal and insurance expertise.
- contemporary artists / restorers / collectors.
CNEP is also applying basic concepts of photochemistry to suggest an original approach to the long-term prediction of plastic weathering. SEPAP units described elsewhere (weather testing of polymers and :fr:photovieillissement accéléré en SEPAP) provoke, in controlled accelerated relevant conditions, the same chemical evolutions than those which should occur at long term in weathering conditions. The SEPAP instrument was originally designed in the late seventies and built by ATLAS MTT in Germany. SEPAP units are now the base of many standard tests (see ).

CNEP approach

The CNEP approach is considering that most of the initial polymer failures have a chemical origin that can be detected by specific analysis at the solid state. Among a large panel of analytical techniques located at CNEP or on the campus, those involving non-destructive infrared and UV-Visible spectroscopy are particularly developed.
In the case of aging analysis, the knowledge of the chemical degradation mechanisms of most polymers allows following degradation at a very low extent both in natural and accelerated conditions. Additional information could also come from the direct analysis of formulation compounds.
CNEP is also developing expertise on the analysis of the organic matters engaged in works of art  as well as for the determination of common initial properties of polymers.

See also
Plastics
Nanocomposite
Composite materials
Polymer
Oxidation
Polymer degradation
Quality control
Standardisation
Photochemistry
Weather testing of polymers
:fr:Photovieillissement accéléré en SEPAP (French)
Weathering

Notes and references

Polymers
Materials degradation